The School of Politics and International Studies (POLIS) is part of the faculty of Education, Social Sciences and Law (ESSL) at the University of Leeds. The head of school is currently Professor Duncan McCargo, who recently replaced Professor Clive Jones.

POLIS runs a number of undergraduate Bachelor of Arts courses in international development, international relations, politics, and politics and parliamentary studies. The school also has a large number of postgraduate students, offering taught Master of Arts courses in Global Development with the opportunity for specialisation in Africa, education, gender, international political economy, and political economy of international resources. MA courses in politics, international relations, conflict, development and security and security, terrorism and insurgency are also available.

Research degrees at the level of MA, MPhil and Ph.D. can all be taken at POLIS.

Owing largely to the international nature of the postgraduate courses offered at POLIS, 50% of postgraduates are international students The School is also closely linked with the Leeds University Centre for African Studies (LUCAS).

References

External links
Official Website

University of Leeds